This is a historical list of members of the Florida House of Representatives from Brevard County, Florida from the formation of the county in 1855 until the creation of districts in 1967. Prior to the creation of Brevard County, the area was called St. Lucia County, and prior to that it was a part of Mosquito County. Prior to the creation of districts in 1967, state representatives were elected by county. Beginning in 1967, Brevard County was represented by the 71st, 72nd, 73rd, and 74th districts. Following redistricting in 1970, the county was represented by the 44th, 45th, 46th, 47th and 48th districts. Following redistricting in 1982, the county was represented by the 31st, 32nd,  33rd, 34th, 77th, and 78th districts. Following redistricting in 1992, the county was represented by the 29th, 30th, 31st, and 32nd districts. Following redistricting in 2002, the county was represented by the 29th, 30th, 31st, 32nd, and 80th districts.

List

See also 
 Government of Brevard County
 History of Brevard County, Florida

References

People from Brevard County, Florida
Lists of Florida politicians
Members of the Florida House of Representatives